Hippeastrum arboricola is a flowering herbaceous bulbous plant in the  family Amaryllidaceae, found in Argentina.

Taxonomy 
Described by Meerow in 1974

References

Sources 
 

Flora of South America
arboricola
Garden plants of South America